Unique was a short-lived post-disco studio act from New Jersey, best known for their crossover number "What I Got Is What You Need" released in 1983 for a well-established dance label, Prelude Records. The group was formed by producer/songwriter Deems J. Smith in 1982 and consists of Smith, Mona Norris, and Darryl K. Henry. The said hit song somewhat established itself on the Billboard Dance Singles and Black Singles charts and even scored over the atlantic reaching No. 27 on UK Singles Chart.

History
Around 1982, record producer  Deems J. Smith hired studio musicians to appear in a project he named Unique. He was signed to dance record label Prelude and under this name released two singles: "What I Got Is What You Need" in 1983 and "You Make Me Feel So Good" in 1984. Other people involved in the group were Mona Maria Norris and Darryl K. Henry who co-wrote "What I Got Is What You Need". Smith wrote the second song alone and it was mixed by an aspiring dance-pop producer Shep Pettibone.

Chart performance

Discography

Singles
"What I Got Is What You Need"

"You Make Me Feel So Good"

Compilation appearances
Their song "What I Got Is What You Need" has been reissued on various compilation albums well into the 21st century including, but not limited to:
 Dance Mix - Dance Hits Volume 2 (1983, CBS),
 Essential 80's Garage Dancefloor Classics Volume 1 (1994, Deepbeats),
 Ferry Maat's Soul Show: Saturday Night Grooves (2005, Disky), 
 Prelude's Greatest Hits - Volume 3 (Unidisc).

Legacy
Japanese rock musician Toshiki Kadomatsu's adopted portions of "What I Got Is What You Need" into "Step Into the Night". It was a Japan-only release by the Victor-RCA label RVC. The song can be found on his 1984 album AFTER 5 CLASH.

English acid house/electronic music group 808 State's song "Anacodia" samples vocals of "What I Got Is What You Need." The song is on their 1989 album 90.

References

External links
 

Electronic music groups from New York (state)
Musical groups established in 1982
Musical groups disestablished in 1984
Prelude Records artists
American post-disco music groups
American dance music groups
American garage house musicians
1982 establishments in New York (state)